Peter of Sicily may refer to:
Petrus Siculus (fl. 870)
Peter I of Sicily = Peter III of Aragon (1282–1285)
Peter II of Sicily (1305–1342)
Peter of Aragon (heir of Sicily) (1398–1400)